Ashley Luke Barnes (born 30 October 1989) is an English professional footballer who plays as a striker for  club Burnley.

Barnes previously played for Paulton Rovers, Plymouth Argyle, Oxford United, Salisbury City, Eastbourne Borough, Torquay United and Brighton & Hove Albion. He was capped by Austria at youth international level, making one appearance for their under-20 team in 2008, but his application for Austrian citizenship was rejected in 2019.

Club career

Early career and Plymouth Argyle
As a child, Barnes played for Bath Arsenal, where his teammates included fellow future professional Scott Sinclair and was briefly in the academy of Bristol Rovers before being released. He began his senior career as a prolific goalscorer with local club Paulton Rovers of the Southern League. He had an extended trial with Championship club Plymouth Argyle in March 2007, and sufficiently impressed to be awarded with an eighteen-month contract by the club, having scored several goals for the reserve team. He made his Plymouth debut in the first round of the League Cup in August 2007 against Wycombe Wanderers, coming on as a substitute for first-team regular Sylvan Ebanks-Blake.

He subsequently found first-team opportunities hard to come by, and was sent on loan to Conference side Oxford United in November 2007 to gain some experience. Barnes featured five times for Oxford United, including two FA Cup ties against Southend United, before returning to Plymouth. He was sent out on loan again in March 2008 to another Conference club, this time to Salisbury City. He featured in five league matches for the club but did not find the back of the net.

Barnes was loaned out for a third time in November 2008 to Eastbourne Borough, with teammate Daniel Smith. He impressed enough for his loan to be extended by a month, before he was recalled by Plymouth Argyle in January 2009, ahead of the club's match against Bristol City. He made his league debut for the Pilgrims against Wolves at Molineux, scoring his first goal for the club against Coventry City. His performances at the back-end of the 2008–09 season were rewarded when he signed a two-year contract extension in May 2009.

He joined League Two club Torquay United on loan until the end of the season in February 2010, but returned a month later having made six appearances.

Brighton & Hove Albion

Barnes subsequently joined League One club Brighton & Hove Albion on loan until the end of the season. He scored on his debut against Tranmere Rovers two days later, having been introduced as a substitute ten minutes earlier.

On 8 July 2010, Barnes signed a two-year contract with Brighton & Hove Albion after transferring for an undisclosed fee from Plymouth Argyle. On 12 April 2011, he scored the decisive goal in a 4–3 win at home against Dagenham & Redbridge, which confirmed their promotion to the Championship. Barnes finished the season as Brighton's second-top goalscorer behind Glenn Murray, with 20 goals in 49 appearances.

In the 2011–12 season Barnes remained a first-choice striker for Brighton's return to the Championship. He finished the season as Brighton's leading goalscorer with 14 goals in all competitions, 11 in the league.

On 9 March 2013, Barnes received a red card in stoppage time against Bolton Wanderers for attempting to trip up the referee. He was subsequently handed a seven-match suspension by the Football Association. Fans and manager Gus Poyet were critical of Barnes for this action as it left the club with only one senior striker available to play, as Craig Mackail-Smith and Will Hoskins were already injured for the rest of the season. On his return from the ban on 20 April, Barnes scored two goals in a 6–1 win over Blackpool and was named man of the match.

Burnley
On 10 January 2014, Barnes joined Burnley for an undisclosed fee on a three-and-a-half-year deal. On 8 November, he scored the only goal at Turf Moor to defeat Hull City and gain Burnley's first win of the Premier League season. He scored a second goal on 13 December, the sole goal in a home victory over Southampton to take Burnley out of the relegation zone. In November 2019, Barnes signed a new contract with Burnley until June 2022.

In February 2015, Barnes performed a high tackle on Chelsea's Nemanja Matić, who was sent off for pushing him in retaliation. Barnes did not receive a booking for the challenge, and The FA confirmed that they would not take retrospective action as that was not normal procedure for attempted tackles. Barnes was publicly criticised by Chelsea manager José Mourinho, and said of the criticism "I found that hilarious".

On 24 May 2015, as relegated Burnley finished the season with a win over Aston Villa, Barnes was taken off with knee cruciate ligament injuries, which would rule him out for the majority of the following campaign.

On 3 March 2018, he wrote himself into the history books, scoring his 16th goal in the Premier League to secure a 2–1 victory for Burnley against Everton. His 16th goal, and his 6th of the season, made him Burnley's leading scorer in the Premier League since it was formed in 1992.

On 13 April 2019, Barnes was booked "in the strangest of circumstances" for kissing defender Joe Bennett during a match against Cardiff City.

On 21 January 2021, Barnes scored the only goal via a penalty in a 1–0 away league win over champions Liverpool, handing them their first league defeat at Anfield in 68 matches and sealed the Clarets' first win at Liverpool since 1974. This ended Liverpool's unbeaten home run in the league which stretched back to April 2017. With Barnes also totalling the 100th goal of his senior career.

International career
While born in Bath to English parents, it was believed that Barnes could qualify to represent Austria courtesy of his paternal grandmother, who was from Klagenfurt, if he were able to acquire Austrian citizenship. He was spotted by Austrian officials while on a pre-season tour with Plymouth Argyle in July 2008, and as a result he was called up to their Under-20 team to face Switzerland on 19 August 2008, the match was part of a four nation friendly tournament featuring Austria, Germany, Italy, and Switzerland.
Barnes made his debut as a substitute in the 73rd minute replacing FC Wacker Innsbruck's Julius Perstaller in front of 250 spectators.

Barnes said in April 2015 that he had had no further contact with the Austrian Football Association, and stated that he was open to representing either England or Austria at senior level if given the opportunity. In March 2017, whilst playing in the Premier League for Burnley, he again confirmed apparent eligibility for both England and Austria, and expressed a desire to represent the Austria national senior side. His form in the 2017–18 season led to calls in Austria for him to receive a national team call-up, and manager Franco Foda confirmed in March 2018 that he was monitoring Barnes.

Barnes started his application for naturalisation as an Austrian citizen in 2018, but it was ultimately unsuccessful after it was rejected by the Austrian Ministry of the Interior in February 2019, thus confirming his ineligibility to represent Austria.

Personal life
Barnes is from Dunkerton, Somerset, near Bath. He attended Writhlington School, near Bath.

Career statistics

Honours
Brighton & Hove Albion
Football League One: 2010–11

References

External links

Profile  at the Burnley F.C. website

1989 births
Living people
Sportspeople from Bath, Somerset
English footballers
Austrian footballers
Association football forwards
Paulton Rovers F.C. players
Plymouth Argyle F.C. players
Oxford United F.C. players
Salisbury City F.C. players
Eastbourne Borough F.C. players
Torquay United F.C. players
Brighton & Hove Albion F.C. players
Burnley F.C. players
English Football League players
National League (English football) players
Premier League players
Austria youth international footballers
English people of Austrian descent